The Nyika rock rat (Aethomys nyikae) is a species of rodent in the family Muridae
found in Angola, the Democratic Republic of the Congo, Malawi, and Zambia.
Its natural habitat is subtropical or tropical dry forest.

References

Aethomys
Rodents of Africa
Mammals described in 1897
Taxa named by Oldfield Thomas
Taxonomy articles created by Polbot